Kvalaberg is a neighborhood (delområde) in the city of Stavanger which lies in the southwestern part of the large municipality of Stavanger in Rogaland county, Norway. It is located in the borough of Hillevåg, between the European route E39 highway and the Gandsfjorden.

References

Boroughs and neighbourhoods of Stavanger